The Freight Train Riders of America (FTRA) is a notional group who move about America by freight hopping ("catching out") in railroad cars, particularly in the northwestern United States and southwestern Canada, and have sometimes been linked to crimes and train derailments.

History and background
The FTRA is sometimes claimed to have been founded by a group of Vietnam veterans in 1984 in a Montana bar. Members of the FTRA claim to be a loosely knit club of people who share a similar lifestyle, organized for mutual support.  FTRA members are most frequently encountered along the BNSF Railway's Hi-Line, which stretches from Chicago to Seattle, often sleeping in switching yards, bridge underpasses and boxcars along the route.

An offshoot of the FTRA, known as the Blood Bound Railroad Gang, distinguishes themselves by wearing red bandanas, as opposed to the FTRA's black bandanas.

In 2011, Gus Melonas, a spokesman for the BNSF, said the "FTRA and associated act[s] of riding and living on the rails have gone largely extinct."

Criminal accusations
Retired Spokane police officer Bob Grandinetti has specialized in investigating the FTRA & FTRC both as a Spokane police officer and since his retirement.  He claims members of the group are linked to food stamp and benefit fraud, illegal drug trafficking, and thefts, as well as brutal assaults and murders committed against other transients, vagrants, and the public. These crimes and incidents have been linked to FTRA and FTRC members:

 The 1996 revenge shooting of 30 year-old Joseph "F-Trooper" Perrigo by fellow FTRA member Martin "Mississippi Bones" Moore stemmed from an altercation the year before regarding Moore's wife, Misty Jane, in which Moore was stabbed and nearly killed. F-Trooper had an arm tattoo reading "FTRA", which led investigators to assume that the organization was factual and not an urban legend. Moore is serving a 25-year sentence for the murder.
 A series of murders of transients along the rails committed by a serial murderer, Robert Joseph Silveria Jr. ("Sidetrack", "Boxcar Bob"), led to police and media attention directed towards the FTRA, including a May 1996 murder, which led to the organization being profiled on America's Most Wanted. Silveria claims not to have been a member of the FTRA, but former police officer Bill Palmini, in his book Murder on the Rails, provides testimony stating otherwise. Silveria is currently serving double life sentences in Wyoming for the murders.
 Michael Elijah Adams ("Dirty Mike"), a native of Michigan, started hopping trains at age 14 and went on to kill more than 16 fellow drifters, according to his reckoning. He is serving 15 years to life for the killing of train-rider John Owens in Placer County, California. He is also a suspect in murders in Texas and Washington, among others. Adams has repeatedly claimed in interviews to having been apprenticed in how to commit serial murder by rail by suspected FTRA enforcer and convicted murderer John "Dogman Tony" Boris (Hugh Ross). Adams was arrested in 2011 for beating to death a fellow transient named John Selmer Owens. Adams has also been connected to the 2006 murder of Robert Allen Chassereau in Virginia. In an interview conducted at Henrico County jail while awaiting sentencing for the murder of Chassereau, Adams remarked how many people he'd killed by saying, “More than 16, less than 30...I’m proud of what I did.”
 A train derailment occurred in Spokane in 1991, in which an unidentified person was found to have severed the air line to the rear cars' brakes. The suspect was killed in the act and his body was recovered wearing a black bandanna with the signature silver-ring conch. This wreck and another one the same week may have been  meant as deterrents against the rail companies by the FTRA. Increased security measures were taken afterwards.
 Robert James LeCou, who was convicted of a 2016 triple homicide in Belfry, Montana and sentenced to 300 years in prison, is said to have been a member of the FTRA.

Realistically, any distinction of the FTRA as an organization, or a count of its members, is a loose one at best, due to the circumstances inherent to rail riding, and to a transient lifestyle in general.  This also speaks to the contradictory information regarding whether or not the FTRA is a well organized criminal group.  Author Richard Grant writes that various FTRA members, including American founder D. Boone, insist the group was founded on the basis of camaraderie between people sharing a similar lifestyle of adventure and not as a criminal organization.

The FTRA and FTRC in popular culture
 Authors Bill Palmini and Bob Grandinetti and science-fiction writer Lucius Shepard have written about the FTRA, as has William T. Vollmann, most notably in his book on freighthopping called Riding Toward Everywhere.
 Members of the FTRA appear in issue six of the comic book Y: The Last Man, in the collection Cycles and Deluxe Book One
 The FTRA is featured in the television drama Numb3rs in the first season on the episode "Sabotage".
 The band Deadbolt references the FTRA in the lyrics of multiple songs on their 2001 train-themed album Hobo Babylon.
 The 1999 Stephen J Cannell novel The Devil's Workshop depicts the FTRA and FTRC as a white-supremacist cult who seeks to release a biological agent into a milk transport.

See also
Robert Joseph Silveria, Jr. (the "Boxcar Killer")

References

External links 
 Mysterious brotherhood may have deadly foothold on the rails 
 Murder on the Rails, by William G. Palmini, Jr. and Tanya Chalupa, New Horizon Press, 2004 
 Who is "Bozo Texino"? – article on FTRA and rail hobo world
 Hopping Freight Trains Facebook Page... 
 FTRA Facebook Page... 
 FTRA Website...

Gangs in the United States
Homelessness organizations
Homelessness in the United States
Hoboes
History of rail transportation in the United States